Dioptis chloris is a moth of the family Notodontidae first described by Herbert Druce in 1893. It is found in southern Ecuador and Peru.

References

Moths described in 1893
Notodontidae of South America